Santos Futebol Clube ( Santos Football Club), also known as Santos  and familiarly as Peixe, is a Brazilian professional goalball club, based in Santos, Brazil. A pioneer in the national sport, Santos FC created a goalball team in 1999 and became, in early 2006, the first football club in Brazil to become a paralympic club. Since then, through a partnership with the Lar das Moças Cegas de Santos (LMC), Santos has Goalball, with male and female teams, as one of its modalities. The sport is growing in popularity. In recent games, the Brazilian national team has featured players from Santos.

References

External links
 

Sports clubs established in 1999
Goalball in Brazil
Santos FC
1999 establishments in Brazil
Goalball in the Americas